Showbiz Inside Report (SIR) is a Philippine showbiz oriented talk show broadcast by ABS-CBN, which premiered on February 4, 2012 replacing Entertainment Live. It is hosted by former Entertainment Live host Ogie Diaz, along with Janice de Belen, Carmina Villaroel and Joey Marquez.

On March 23, 2013, Joey Marquez announced that he will leave the show due to political responsibilities.
On April 6, 2013, the show celebrated its first anniversary and welcomes Villaroel's husband Zoren Legaspi to replace Marquez as a guest host. Marquez later returned after he lost the 2013 elections. 
On September 28, 2013, the show aired its final episode after the network decided to cancel it to pave the way for the movie block ABS-CBN Sabado Specials.

Origin
The Saturday talk show serves weekly updates and serves two investigative reports based on the week or months trending topics or two featured Philippine artists, whether in the public scene or in the showbiz industry.

Hosts

Main hosts
 Janice de Belen (2012–2013)
 Carmina Villaroel (2012–2013)
 Ogie Diaz (2012–2013)
 Joey Marquez (2012–2013)

Online hosts
 Cesca Litton
 MJ Felipe

Guest host
 Zoren Legaspi (2013)

See also
 List of programs broadcast by ABS-CBN

References

External links

ABS-CBN original programming
Entertainment news shows in the Philippines
2012 Philippine television series debuts
2013 Philippine television series endings
Filipino-language television shows